Angels Flight is the eighth novel by American crime author Michael Connelly, and the sixth featuring the Los Angeles detective Hieronymus "Harry" Bosch.

Plot summary
Los Angeles Police Department Detective Harry Bosch is assigned to investigate the murder of prominent African-American attorney Howard Elias late on a Friday night on Angels Flight, a funicular railway in downtown L.A. Elias was found shot to death along with a Hispanic woman, Catalina Perez. The detectives from Robbery-Homicide Division who were initially assigned to the case conclude that Perez was an innocent bystander and that Elias was the target. Elias was known for representing plaintiffs in racial harassment and police violence suits against the LAPD, and had a bad reputation in the department. Due to the accuracy of the gunshots used in the crime, Bosch realizes that his fellow police officers are the most likely suspects.

Despite the fact that the murders were not in Bosch's precinct, Hollywood Division, Deputy Chief of Police Irvin Irving is forced to remove RHD because many of its detectives are defendants in a case Elias was bringing to federal court. Elias was representing a man named Michael Harris who was recently acquitted of the murder of Stacey Kincaid, the young daughter of a prominent local car dealer. Harris claims that the fingerprint evidence against him was planted, and that detectives from RHD tortured him in an effort to obtain a confession. Irving and Bosch are aware that Elias' death could inflame tensions in South-Central L.A., possibly leading to a repeat of the riots of 1992, especially if his killer was found to be a police officer. Bosch suspects that he is being set up to fail by Irving after one of his rivals, Detective John Chastain of the Internal Affairs Division, is assigned to help him work the case.

After informing Elias' wife and son in Baldwin Village, Bosch and Chastain determine that Elias was on Angels Flight because he often stayed downtown overnight while working on cases. The detectives enter Elias' apartment without a search warrant, and find evidence that he was having an affair with LAPD Inspector-General Carla Entrenkin, but the evidence was removed by the time the detectives returned with a  warrant. Bosch is instructed to halt his search of Elias' office by the district attorney, who informs him that Entrenkin is to be appointed special master to oversee the opening of Elias' files to protect attorney-client privilege on his ongoing cases. Bosch confronts Entrenkin, who confesses that she loved Elias and broke into his apartment after being informed of his death.

Entrenkin clears the majority of Elias' files to be reviewed by Bosch's investigators, and reveals that Elias was planning to prove who really killed Kincaid in court. They find a series of anonymous letters mailed to Elias that apparently tipped him off about Harris' innocence. These include several coded messages and a print-out of an L.A. prostitute's website. Bosch meets with his former partner Detective Frankie Sheehan, who was assigned to the Harris case. He admits to Bosch that he tortured Harris, but says that he did not plant Harris' fingerprints in Stacey Kincaid's room. Bosch talks to Elias' private investigator, who reveals the exculpatory evidence that Elias uncovered. One of the anonymous letters tipped Elias off that Stacey Kincaid's mother had her car detailed at the place Harris worked, explaining how Harris' fingerprints could have ended up on Kincaid's geography textbook. Bosch also finds two homeless men who report that Kincaid's body was moved to the location where it was found after Harris had already been taken into police custody.  He now knows that Harris is innocent.

Bosch's partner Detective Kizmin Rider then figures out the meaning of two more of the anonymous letters sent to Elias. They reveal how to gain access to a child pornography website hidden within the prostitute's webpage, showing photos of Stacey Kincaid being sexually abused for years before her murder. Rider believes that Stacey's stepfather, Sam Kincaid, is the man in the pictures. She says that when Elias accessed this website, he set off a warning system to its administrators, possibly precipitating his murder. Bosch theorizes that Stacey's mother, Kate Kincaid, was the one who sent the anonymous tip to Elias, knowing that it would reveal her husband's guilt. After learning that Sheehan's wife had left him, Bosch invites the detective to stay at his house.

Bosch meets Kate, who she confirms that her husband was a pedophile who killed Stacey. Bosch takes a phone call from a Federal Bureau of Investigation agent who is executing a search warrant on the Kincaids' house. Sam Kincaid and his security guard, who assisted in Stacey's murder, were found after having been shot to death by Kate Kincaid. As Bosch is learning of this development on the phone, Kate kills herself with the same gun.

When Bosch returns home, he finds Sheehan dead, after apparently having committed suicide. Ballistics match Sheehan's gun to the weapons used to kill Elias and Perez, and Irving and the chief of police announce that the case is closed. Entrenkin announces that she will resign as LAPD inspector-general and take over Elias' practice, representing Harris in the police brutality case. Riots break out along Normandie Avenue in South-Central L.A.

Entrenkin calls Bosch, and informs him that he has missed a vital clue in Elias' files. Bosch finds that Chastain was set to be called as a witness by Elias during the Harris trial, and that he had secretly sold information to Elias on previous cases. After conferring with Sheehan's superior at RHD, Bosch learns that Chastain found evidence proving that Harris was tortured, but was convinced to keep quiet by Irving. The detectives realize that Elias planned to expose Chastain's cover-up in trial, ruining his career while revealing him as a police department snitch. Bosch travels to LAPD headquarters, and finds that Chastain substituted rounds fired by Sheehan in a legal shooting some years earlier for the actual slugs found in Elias and Perez's bodies to frame Sheehan. Bosch also determines that Chastain killed Sheehan at his house and made it look like a suicide.

Bosch drives into South-Central L.A. to arrest Chastain, who has been deployed there to help control the riots. En route back to police headquarters, Bosch accidentally drives into an uncontrolled riot on Normandie. A gang of African-Americans attack his car and throw a Molotov cocktail through the windshield. Bosch drives away into a police barricade, but realizes that Chastain was pulled from the backseat and is being beaten by the mob. Chastain dies before police backup arrives. Bosch reflects that Chastain will be made out as a martyr by Irving in an effort to quell the riots, with the Angels Flight murders pinned on Sheehan, and that he will have no choice but to keep quiet in order to save his job.

TV adaptation
The events of Angels Flight were adapted as the main plotline in the fourth season of the Amazon Studios show Bosch. The collateral victim to Elias's murder is changed from a housekeeper to Landon Johnson, the funicular's operator. The mystery of who really killed Stacey Kincaid is reduced to a single line of dialogue as Bosch and Chandler are interviewing Harris. Elias's mistress Carla Emtremkin is split into two separate characters, with her role as Elias's mistress going to his jury consultant Pamela Duncan, while her role as the special master is given to Honey Chandler. Chastain is also split into two separate Internal Affairs detectives, Amy Snyder (returning from season 3) and Gabrielle Lincoln, with the rest of the task force being filled out by Robertson and Pierce. Sheehan is not killed, as Bosch's task force is able to bring him in, and he is later released after it is proven that he was framed. As Irving is not an obstructive bureaucrat in the show, he does not make any attempt to throw his detectives under the bus, with him instead maneuvering to damage Mayor Hector Ramos's reputation after Ramos declares he is going to be siding with the protestors demonstrating outside Hollywood Station, and also co-opting the protestors' lead activist offering her a job on the police oversight board, compromising her in the eyes of the other protestors when they see her talking to Irving.

Most significantly, the motive for Elias's murder has changed, as it's revealed that Elias was part of a scheme with Lincoln and Police Commission president Bradley Walker where he would file police brutality lawsuits off inside information given to him from Lincoln via Walker, and then he and Walker would split the money from the settlements, Walker using it to fund his real estate projects. The deal when Elias decided he wanted to take Harris's case to trial rather than settle out of court, after he saw a hidden camera video of Sheehan and Terry Drake torturing Harris. Elias would have named Walker as the source of the video at trial, and this was what prompted Walker to murder him. Walker's alibi is that he was at a fundraiser at the Biltmore Hotel, something Bosch can testify to as he was at the fundraiser following Walker, who he suspects was responsible for the death of his mother in 1979 and the arson murder in season 3 of the detective who investigated that murder. To incriminate Walker, Bosch tricks him into revealing where he hid the gun he used to kill Johnson and Elias, with the gun linking him to the murders as Pierce is able to recover the bullet that killed Johnson.

References

1999 American novels
Harry Bosch series
Novels set in Los Angeles
Fictional portrayals of the Los Angeles Police Department
Little, Brown and Company books